The Yonkers Marathon, is a marathon race held annually in Yonkers, New York. Founded in 1907, it is the second oldest marathon in the United States, after the Boston Marathon. It is held on the third Sunday in October. In addition to the marathon, there is a half marathon race and a 5K course. At the end of the race there is a gathering and festivities centered on Van de Donck Park.

History
The first Yonkers Marathon was held on Thanksgiving Day 1907. From 1907 to 1945, the race was typically held in November.
Johnny Hayes and Jim Crowley won the first two races. Sammy Mellor helped establish the Yonkers Marathon with Edward Wetmore Kinsley, and finished second in the event's first two runnings.
In 1909 the race was sponsored by the Mercury Athletic Club.

From 1938 to 1965, and again in 1974, the Yonkers Marathon was recognised by the Amateur Athletic Union as the USA Marathon Championships, and in relevant years as a qualifying event for the US Olympic team.

The race has averaged roughly 200 finishers during the 2010s, double the number from the prior decade. The 2015 (90th anniversary) course was USA Track & Field certified and served as a qualifying event for the Boston Marathon.

The 2020 edition of the race was cancelled due to the coronavirus pandemic, with all registrants automatically receiving refunds.

The 2022 edition saw 101 finishers and Juan Fernandez De Cordova won the event in 2 hours, 48 minutes and 3 seconds.

Course

The double-loop course of the Yonkers Marathon has been known as being tough and hilly; New York City Marathon founder Fred Lebow cited it as one of his favorite marathons. For its 90th running in 2015 the track had a newly designed course that added greater variety by eliminating the double-loop, and replacing it with a single-loop that followed a scenic route along the Hudson River, and then all over the city, past parks, past the Dunwoodie Golf Course (offering a glimpse of the distant New York City skyline), and through a variety of neighborhoods. In 2016 the course reverted to the double-loop.

Notes

References

External links
Official website
Association of Road Racing Statisticians - Yonkers Marathon.

Marathon
Marathons in the United States
October sporting events
1907 establishments in New York (state)
Recurring sporting events established in 1907